Joseph Njang Mbah Ndam was a Cameroonian politician. He was a member of the opposition Social Democratic Front and served as its party chairman. He was also a member of the Pan-African Parliament.

See also
 List of members of the Pan-African Parliament

He died on April 13, 2020 in Yaounde Cameroons Capital following an illness.

References

Year of birth missing (living people)
Living people
Members of the Pan-African Parliament from Cameroon
Social Democratic Front (Cameroon) politicians
Members of the National Assembly (Cameroon)